The Hong Kong Export Credit Insurance Corporation was established in 1966 under the Hong Kong Export Credit Insurance Corporation Ordinance (Chapter 1115). It was created by statute with the aim of encouraging and supporting export trade by providing Hong Kong exporters with insurance protection against non-payment risks arising from commercial and political events. Its contingent liability under contracts of insurance is guaranteed by the Government of the Hong Kong Special Administrative Region, with the statutory maximum liability currently standing at $55 billion. The Corporation is required to operate in accordance with the requirements laid down in the Hong Kong Export Credit Insurance Corporation Ordinance and to pursue a policy directed towards securing revenue sufficient to meet all expenditure properly chargeable to its revenue account. It is a 'public body' under the Prevention of Bribery Ordinance. HKECIC staff are not permitted to accept any advantages from HKECIC customers. Anybody offering any advantages to HKECIC staff in connection with official business commits an offence.

Corporate Governance
The Hong Kong Export Credit Insurance Corporation (HKECIC) is a statutory organisation governed by the Hong Kong Export Credit Insurance Corporation Ordinance (Chapter 1115) (HKECIC Ordinance). The Corporation is committed to high standards of corporate governance and stresses integrity, accountability and transparency in its corporate governance framework.

Management
Commissioner:Terence Chiu
General manager:Cynthia Chin
Deputy General Managers:Amy Wai, Queenie Chan, Joe Louie

Advisory Board
Advisory BoardIn the general consideration of its insurance and investment-related business, the Corporation is advised by an Advisory Board. Membership includes leaders from the finance, insurance, trade and services sectors and government officials.

External links
EC-link
EC-Reach

YouTube

Export credit agencies
Export Credit Insurance Corporation
Foreign trade of Hong Kong